A battalion is a military unit of several hundred soldiers.

Battalion may also refer to:

Battalion (Sweden), a 17th- and 18th-century combat unit
The Battalion, the student newspaper of Texas A&M University
Battalion (comics), a number of characters in comics
Brampton Battalion, a Canadian major junior ice hockey team
 was launched at Whitby in 1795. A  French privateer captured her in 1797. 
Battalion (1927 film), a silent Czech film
Battalion (1937 film), a remake of the silent Czech film
Battalion (2015 film), a Russian film
Battalion, 2012 novel by Adam Hamdy

See also